The Public Insight Network (sometimes referred to as PIJ) is an approach to journalism created by American Public Media. It recognizes that broadcast media today operates in a changed media environment, and needs to expand the resources available to journalists when deciding what is news and reporting on that news, as well as be responsive to audience desires to participate.  

Through a collection of tools, many of them web-based, MPR News solicits knowledge and direct experience from people in its Public Insight Network. The basic goal is to do better journalism through increased public input.  

Public Insight Network contributes to national shows such as Marketplace, and is being rolled out on a limited basis to other public radio stations in the U.S. The MPR radio show In the Loop is directly associated with PIJ.

In late 2006, Public Insight Network became the core of a new MPR initiative called the Center for Innovation in Journalism.

See also
American Public Media
Minnesota Public Radio

References

External links
 Public Insight Network

Citizen journalism

American Public Media Group